Bernard Shiffman (born 23 June 1942) is an American mathematician, specializing in complex geometry and analysis of complex manifolds.

Education and career
Shiffman received in 1964 from Massachusetts Institute of Technology (MIT) a bachelor's degree and in 1968 from the University of California, Berkeley a PhD under Shiing-Shen Chern with thesis On the removal of singularities in several complex variables. Shiffman was at MIT a C.L.E. Moore Instructor from 1968 to 1970 and at Yale University an assistant professor from 1970 to 1973. At Johns Hopkins University he was from 1973 to 1977 an associate professor and is from 1977 a full professor; he was the chair of the department of mathematics from 1990 to 1993 and again from 2012 to 2014. He has held visiting positions in the US, France, Germany, and Sweden.

For the two academic years 1973–1975 Shiffman was a Sloan Research Fellow. From 1993 to 2005 he was editor-in-chief of The American Journal of Mathematics. He was  elected a Fellow of the American Mathematical Society in 2012.

His father was the mathematician Max Shiffman.

Selected publications

Articles
 
 
 with Maurizio Cornalba: 
 with Reese Harvey: 
  (survey article, an expanded version of an invited address given at the Cambridge, Mass., meeting of the AMS on 25 October 1975)
 with Robert E. Molzon and Nessim Sibony: 
 with Shanyu Ji and János Kollár: 
 with Alexander Russakovskii: 
 with Steven Zelditch: 
 with Pavel Bleher and S. Zelditch:  arXiv preprint
 with Michael R. Douglas and S. Zelditch:

Books
 with Andrew J. Sommese: Vanishing theories on complex manifolds, Progress in Mathematics 56, Birkhäuser Verlag 1985.

References

External links
 Home page for Shiffman at Johns Hopkins University
 Preprints from arXiv.org

20th-century American mathematicians
21st-century American mathematicians
Complex analysts
Massachusetts Institute of Technology alumni
University of California, Berkeley alumni
Johns Hopkins University faculty
Fellows of the American Mathematical Society
1942 births
Living people
Institute for Advanced Study visiting scholars